Workbench Songs is an album by American singer-songwriter Guy Clark, released on July 10, 2006. It was nominated for "Best Contemporary Folk/Americana Album" at the Grammy Awards.

Track listing
 "Walking Man" (Guy Clark, Steve Nelson) – 3:02
 "Magdalene" (Clark, Ray Stephenson) – 4:09
 "Tornado Time in Texas" (Clark, Verlon Thompson) – 3:26
 "Funny Bone" (Clark, Ray Stephenson) – 3:56
 "Exposé" (Clark, Rodney Crowell, Hank DeVito) – 2:19
 "Out in the Parkin' Lot" (Clark, Darrell Scott) – 4:51
 "No Lonesome Tune" (Townes Van Zandt) – 4:03
 "Cinco de Mayo in Memphis" (Clark, Chuck Mead) – 3:05
 "Analog Girl" (Clark, Verlon Thompson) – 3:34
 "Worry B Gone" (Clark, Gary Nicholson, Lee Roy Parnell) – 3:14
 "Diamond Joe" (Traditional) – 2:51

Personnel
Guy Clark – vocals, guitar
Eddie Bayers – drums, percussion
Bryn Bright – bass, cello, harmony vocals
Shawn Camp – fiddle, guitar, mandolin, harmony vocals
Kevin Grantt – bass, piano
Morgane Hayes – harmony vocals
Wayne Killius – drums
Chris Latham – guitar, violin, keyboards, trumpet, viola
Verlon Thompson – guitar, harmonica, mandolin, harmony vocals

Production notes
Chris Latham – engineer, mixing, mastering
Gina R. Binkley – design

Chart positions

References

External links
[ Allmusic entry.]

2006 albums
Guy Clark albums
Sugar Hill Records albums